Kim Jin-sil (born 1 October 1994) is a South Korean handball player who plays for the club Busan Infrastructure. She is member of the South Korean national team. She competed at the 2015 World Women's Handball Championship in Denmark.

References

1994 births
Living people
South Korean female handball players